Renato Rota (born 21 December 1946) is an Italian racing cyclist. He rode in the 1970 Tour de France.

References

1946 births
Living people
Italian male cyclists
Place of birth missing (living people)